The Beijing Language and Culture University Press (BLCUP; 北京语言大学出版社) is a publisher and university press that specializes in publishing Chinese textbooks. Established as a department within Beijing Language and Culture University, the press issued its first title in 1985.

References

Beijing Language and Culture University
University presses of China
Educational book publishing companies
Publishing companies established in 1985
Book publishing companies of China
Mass media in Beijing
Chinese companies established in 1985